Bloomfield Township is a township in Clinton County, Iowa, USA.  As of the 2000 census, its population was 865.

History
Bloomfield Township was organized in 1855.

Geography
According to the USGS, it contains three cemeteries: Bloomfield, Evergreen and Saint Patricks.

Notes

References
 USGS Geographic Names Information System (GNIS)

External links
 US-Counties.com
 City-Data.com

Townships in Clinton County, Iowa
Townships in Iowa
1855 establishments in Iowa
Populated places established in 1855